Jeong Jin-ho (born February 8, 1996) is a South Korean football player.

Playing career
Jeong Jin-ho played for J2 League club; Kamatamare Sanuki in 2015 season.

References

External links

1996 births
Living people
South Korean footballers
J2 League players
Kamatamare Sanuki players
Association football midfielders